Clay Township is the name of some places in the U.S. state of Pennsylvania:
Clay Township, Butler County, Pennsylvania
Clay Township, Huntingdon County, Pennsylvania
Clay Township, Lancaster County, Pennsylvania

Pennsylvania township disambiguation pages